SES-3 is a communications satellite operated by SES World Skies, then by SES S.A.

Spacecraft 
SES-3 was built by Orbital Sciences Corporation (OSC), and is based on the Star-2.4 satellite bus. It has a design life of fifteen years, however it was launched with enough fuel to operate for at least sixteen years, if its systems are still functional.

Launch 
It was launched on 15 July 2011 at 23:16:10 UTC on a Proton-M / Briz-M launch vehicle, the launch was arranged by International Launch Services (ILS), since Baikonour, Site 200/39 alongside the KazSat-2 satellite.

Mission 
It is positioned at 103.0° West orbital location over North America, replacing AMC-1. Clients include E. W. Scripps Company, In Demand, Pay-per-view, Ion Television, Mood Media, NBC and QVC.

References 

Communications satellites in geostationary orbit
Spacecraft launched in 2011
SES satellites
Satellites using the GEOStar bus
Satellites of Luxembourg